Bean paste can refer to:
Fermented bean paste, a savory or spicy fermented paste made typically of salted soybeans, used in many Asian cultures
Sweet bean paste, a sweetened paste made from various types of beans that are used as a filling in many East Asian desserts